The 1998 BC Lions finished in third place in the West Division with a 9–9 record. After beginning the year 3-6, head coach and general manager Adam Rita stepped down as coach in order to focus on his GM duties. Greg Mohns replaced him and led the Lions to a 6-3 finish and a playoff berth. They appeared in the West Semi-Final, but lost to the Edmonton Eskimos.

Offseason

CFL Draft

Preseason

Regular season

Season standings

Season schedule

Awards and records
CFL's Most Outstanding Rookie Award – Steve Muhammad (DB)

1998 CFL All-Stars
OT – Moe Elewonibi, CFL All-Star
DT – Johnny Scott, CFL All-Star
CB – Steve Muhammad, CFL All-Star
DS – Dale Joseph, CFL All-Star

Western Division All-Star Selections
RB – Juan Johnson, Western All-Star
OT – Moe Elewonibi, Western All-Star
DT – Dave Chaytors, Western All-Star
DT – Johnny Scott, Western All-Star
CB – Steve Muhammad, Western All-Star
DB – Glenn Rogers Jr., Western All-Star
DS – Dale Joseph, Western All-Star
K – Lui Passaglia, Western All-Star

1998 Intergold CFLPA All-Stars
OG – Jamie Taras, Intergold CFLPA All-Star

Playoffs

West Semi-Final

References

BC Lions seasons
BC Lions
1998 in British Columbia